Space is a compilation album by George Benson released in 1978 on CTI Records.  It features his rendition of Sam & Dave's "Hold On, I'm Coming" recorded during the Good King Bad sessions as well as some additional songs from his Carnegie Hall performance.

Track listing
All tracks recorded live at Carnegie Hall, except as noted.

Side one
"Hold On, I'm Coming (5:44) " Previously Unreleased.  Recorded at Van Gelder Studios, later included as a bonus track on the CD release of Good King Bad
"Summertime" (7:16)  from In Concert-Carnegie Hall 
"Sky Dive" (6:51)  Previously Unreleased

Side two
"Octane" (10:12)  from In Concert-Carnegie Hall 
"Gone" (Incorrectly listed as "No Sooner Said Than Done") (8:04)  from In Concert-Carnegie Hall

Personnel
George Benson - guitar, vocals
Phil Upchurch, Eric Gale - guitar
Hubert Laws - flute
Don Grolnick, Cliff Carter, Ronnie Foster - keyboards
Will Lee, Wilbur Bascomb, Jr., Wayne Dockery - bass guitar
Steve Gadd, Andy Newmark, Marvin Chappell - drums
Ray Armando, Johnny Griggs, Sue Evans - percussion
Randy Brecker - trumpet
Fred Wesley - trombone
Frank Vicari - tenor saxophone
Ronnie Cuber - baritone saxophone

References

1978 compilation albums
George Benson albums
Albums recorded at Carnegie Hall
CTI Records albums
Albums produced by Creed Taylor